The R29 is a provincial route in South Africa that connects Johannesburg with Leandra and Kinross via Germiston, Boksburg, Benoni and Springs. For much of its route it is named Main Reef Road. The R29 used to end near the Golela border post, however the section from Evander to Ermelo is now part of the N17 (prior to construction of the N17 extension from Leandra to Evander, the N17 followed the alignment of R29 from Leandra; however, the extension of the N17 highway has resulted in the old section of the road being given to R29) and the section from Ermelo to the Golela border post just after Pongola is now part of the N2.

From Springs to the R580 junction north of Evander, the R29 is parallel to the N17 Highway.

Route

Gauteng
The R29 begins in Johannesburg, Gauteng, at a junction with the R41 Road (Main Reef Road) in the Westgate suburb adjacent to the Johannesburg CBD, as Marshall Street eastwards and Anderson Street westwards (one-way streets). The R29 continues eastwards as John Page Street by way of a right turn after the Jeppestown suburb. Shortly after, it becomes Main Reef Road. After Cleveland, the route continues by way of a right turn at Kraft Road to fly over the N3/N12 Highway (Johannesburg Eastern Bypass), where it leaves Johannesburg and enters Germiston in the City of Ekurhuleni Metropolitan Municipality.

At Primrose (north of Germiston Central), the R29 continues by way of a right turn at Shamrock Road, where it meets the M37 Municipal Route and the southern terminus of the M57 Municipal Route. At the next junction, the R29 continues eastwards by way of a left turn towards Boksburg. At Boksburg North, it intersects with the R21 and continues as Cason Road (forming the northern boundary of the Boksburg CBD) up to its junction with the M43 road, where it enters Benoni. Through Benoni Central, It is Princess Avenue eastwards and Ampthill Avenue westwards (one-way streets) (meeting the R23 Route during this time), up to the Kleinfontein suburb, where it is named Main Reef Road again and proceeds by way of a right turn to reach a major junction with the M45 Municipal Route, which it becomes cosigned with southwards. After Mackenzie Park, north of Brakpan, the R29 becomes its own road eastwards while the M45 continues southwards to Brakpan Central. Just after, the R29 continues by a right turn at Modder Road eastwards.

By Kingsway (south of Daveyton), the R29 joins the R51 Road (Kingsway Road) southwards for 5 km before splitting in the vicinity of Springs (at 4th Avenue). The R29 continues eastwards and meets the south-western terminus of the R555 (Welgedacht Road) in the Old Springs suburb before becoming two one-way streets southwards (3rd Street and 4th Street) and two one-way streets eastwards (1st Avenue and 2nd Avenue) before becoming one street eastwards.

From Springs, the R29 makes a 38 km journey eastwards to Devon, intersecting with the R42 midway between Springs and Devon. From Devon, it continues eastwards for 16 km to leave Gauteng and reach the town of Leandra in the Mpumalanga Province. The R29 is parallel to the N17 National Route from Springs to Leandra. (Also used as an alternative and backup route when the N17 Highway has issues)

Mpumalanga
The R29 used to end in Leandra by the R50 Road Junction, with the road continuing eastwards being part of the N17 National Route (The N17 formed a Z-Shape in Leandra, Cosigned with the R50 up to this junction before turning eastwards). But Today, the N17 East is now a continuous straight Highway from its primary junction with the R50 south of Leandra, letting the continuous road from the R29 & R50 junction eastwards also remain with the R29 designation.

The R29 remains following and being an alternative route to the N17 Highway up to a point north-east of Evander and north-west of Secunda. From The R50 junction in Leandra, the R29 journeys eastwards for 20 km to the town of Kinross (North of Evander), where it meets the R547 Road. After Kinross, it goes for another 10 km eastwards to mark its end at a point north-west of Secunda, known as the Leven Station Junction, where it meets the R580 Road and the N17 Highway.

Old Road Through Johannesburg South
The road from the Johannesburg Stock Exchange to Ormonde, named Simmonds Road closer to Johannesburg CBD (meeting the M2 Highway) and Booysens Road through Booysens up to the M1 Highway, is labelled as R29 in some parts of the road. The road is officially designated as the M27, but some areas have it indicated as the R29 Road on road signs.

On Johannesburg street signs, both the M27 and R29 symbols show on the street, from the Simmonds Road junction with Anderson Street south to Booysens. The signs suggest that the R29 does not end in Johannesburg Central, but instead becomes Simmonds Road/Booysens Road at their intersection and concludes at the junction with the M1 Highway (cosigned with the M27), with the section Of Anderson Street from the Simmonds Avenue junction to the Main Reef Road junction west of Johannesburg Central being part of the R41.

Also, the R553 Road (Golden Highway) connecting Johannesburg South with Eldorado Park may have been designated as the R29 in the past before the reformation of the South African Road System, as there is a road sign at its intersection with the M68 (Old Potchefstroom Road) near Southgate where it is designated as the R29.

It may suggest that the old R29 road passed through this section of Johannesburg going westwards before reformation of the South African Road System in 1970.

References

External links
 Routes Travel Info

29
29
Streets and roads of Johannesburg
Provincial routes in South Africa